Spartan Steel & Alloys Ltd v Martin & Co (Contractors) Ltd [1973] QB 27 is a well-known English Court of Appeal case concerning the recovery of pure economic loss in negligence.

Facts
Spartan Steel and Alloys Ltd had a stainless steel factory in Birmingham, which obtained its electricity by a direct cable from the power station. Martin & Co Ltd were doing work on the ground with an excavator and negligently damaged that cable (Spartan Steel did not own the cable). As a consequence, the factory was deprived of electricity for 15 hours which caused physical damage to the factory’s furnaces and metal, loss of profit on the damaged metal and loss of profit on the metal that was not melted during the time the electricity was off. Spartan Steel claimed all the three heads of damage.

Judgment
The Court of Appeal, consisting of Lord Denning MR, Edmund-Davies LJ and Lawton LJ delivered a majority judgment (Edmund-Davies LJ dissenting), that the Spartan Steel could only recover the damages to their furnaces, the metal they had to discard and the profit lost on the discarded metal. They could not recover the profits lost due to the factory not being operational for 15 hours. Their main reasoning for this was that while the metal was physical damage and the lost profits was "directly consequential" upon the damage, the profits lost due to the blackout constituted "pure economic loss".

Although the majority seemed to agree that Martin & Co Ltd owed the Spartan Steel a duty of care and the damage was not too remote since it was foreseeable, they declined to allow the recovery of pure economic loss for policy reasons outlined by Lord Denning in his leading judgment.

Dissent by Edmund-Davies LJ
Edmund-Davies LJ did not agree with the majority, finding that the loss was both direct and foreseeable consequence of the defendant's negligence and should therefore be recovered. In his view, in most cases, spurious claims could be avoided either on the grounds that no duty was owed or that the damage was too remote.

Significance
The judgment has outlined in very clear terms that there are two types of economic loss: economic loss consequential on physical damage and "pure" economic loss. Only the first is in principle recoverable. This has led to much litigation concerning the precise distinction between economic and physical damage as well as to disagreements when the economic loss could be seen as consequential upon physical loss.

See also
English tort law
Negligence
Pure economic loss
Dominion Tape of Canada Ltd v LR McDonald& Sons Ltd [1971] 3 OR 627, 21 DLR (3d) 299 (Co. Ct.), a similar Canadian case

Notes

English tort case law
Lord Denning cases
1973 in British law
Court of Appeal (England and Wales) cases
1973 in case law